The 2019 South African Athletics Championships was the 109th edition of the national championship in outdoor track and field for South Africa. It was held on 25–27 April at the Germiston Stadium in Germiston. It served as the selection meeting for South Africa at the 2019 World Athletics Championships.

Results

Men

Women

References

Results
 ASA SENIOR CHAMPIONSHIPS 2019 at GERMISTON STADIUM. Athletics South Africa. Retrieved 2021-04-02.

External links
 Official website of Athletics South Africa

2019
South African Athletics Championships
South African Athletics Championships
Sport in Gauteng
Sport in Germiston